Massachusetts is the seventh studio album from folk music singer Lori McKenna. The album reached No. 18 on the Billboard Folk Albums chart.

Track listing 
 Salt
 My Love Follows You Where You Go
 Susanna
 Smaller and Smaller    
 Make Every Word Hurt    
 Shake    
 How Romantic is That    
 Shouting    
 Better With Time    
 Take Me With You When You Go    
 Love Can Put It Back Together    
 Grown Up Now

With “Grown Up Now” being about the life of McKenna’s first child (Brian) who is also a songwriter.

Charts

References 

Lori McKenna albums
2013 albums